Joseph Biles Anthony (June 19, 1795 – January 10, 1851) was an American lawyer and politician from Pennsylvania who served as a Democratic member of the U.S. House of Representatives for two terms, representing Pennsylvania's 16th congressional district from 1833 to 1837.

Life and career
Joseph Biles Anthony was born in Philadelphia, Pennsylvania.  He attended public schools and Princeton College.  He studied law, was admitted to the bar and practiced law.  He was a member of the Pennsylvania State Senate for the 13th district from 1830 to 1833.

Congress
Anthony was elected as a Jacksonian to the Twenty-third and Twenty-fourth Congresses.

Later career and death
After leaving Congress, he was appointed judge of the ‘Nichelson court’, and engaged in the sale of titles to large tracts of lands in Pennsylvania.  He was elected president judge of the eighth district in 1844 and served until his death in Williamsport, Pennsylvania.

He was buried in Williamsport Cemetery.

Notes

References

The Political Graveyard

|-

1795 births
1851 deaths
19th-century American judges
19th-century American lawyers
19th-century American politicians
Burials in Pennsylvania
Jacksonian members of the United States House of Representatives from Pennsylvania
Democratic Party Pennsylvania state senators
Pennsylvania state court judges
Democratic Party members of the United States House of Representatives from Pennsylvania
Pennsylvania lawyers
Politicians from Philadelphia
Princeton University alumni